Toby Garbett (born 14 November 1976 in Chertsey) is a British rower.

References 
 
 

1976 births
Living people
English male rowers
British male rowers
Sportspeople from Chertsey
Olympic rowers of Great Britain
Rowers at the 2004 Summer Olympics
World Rowing Championships medalists for Great Britain